Gränna is a locality in Jönköping Municipality, Jönköping County, Sweden with 2,665 inhabitants in 2018. Founded in 1652 by Count Per Brahe, it is in Småland on the eastern shores of the lake Vättern, about 40 km north of Jönköping.

The town is at the foot of Gränna mountain and is characterized by its steep streets and old wooden houses.

Up until the local government reform of 1971, Gränna and its immediate surroundings constituted a city municipality of its own; since then it has become an integral part of Jönköping Municipality.

Gränna is, despite its small population, for historical reasons often still referred to as a city. Statistics Sweden, however, only counts localities with more than 10,000 inhabitants as cities.

Gränna is known for its red and white polkagris (literally "polka pig" in Swedish) stick candy, also known as peppermint rock. This was first made by the widow Amalia Eriksson in 1859. A statue of Amalia can now be seen in the park at the foot of Gränna mountain. The town is popular with tourists and is a connection point for the ferry service to the island Visingsö.

The balloonist Salomon August Andrée, who died in an attempt to reach the North Pole by balloon, was born in Gränna. The Grenna Museum hosts an exhibition of the expedition together with a comprehensive collection of related objects and photos.

Gränna in popular culture
When Niklas Strömstedt wrote lyrics in Swedish for the musical Mamma Mia!, Glasgow was replaced by "Gränna" as the place which the singer calls from in the lyrics of the song Super Trouper.

References

External links 

Gränna-Visingsö Tourist Information
Grenna Museum - Andréexpedition Polarcenter

Populated lakeshore places in Sweden
Populated places in Jönköping Municipality